Shelter Island Country Club is a historic country club located at Shelter Island in Suffolk County, New York. The club was established in 1901 and consists of a nine-hole golf course, club house, driving range, and maintenance facility.  The club house is a two-story Colonial Revival-style wood-frame building with a side-gabled gambrel roof with five dormer windows on both the east and west elevations.  It features a full-length front porch on the east and north sides.

It was added to the National Register of Historic Places in 2009.

References

External links
 The club's website

Clubhouses on the National Register of Historic Places in New York (state)
1901 establishments in New York (state)
Colonial Revival architecture in New York (state)
Buildings and structures in Suffolk County, New York
Sports organizations established in 1901
National Register of Historic Places in Suffolk County, New York